Lewis High School was a school serving African American students in Macon, Georgia. Organized and funded by the American Missionary Association, it was named for General John R. Lewis, the leader of the Freedmen's Bureau in Georgia.

William Sanders Scarborough attended the school and returned to teach at it. He also met his wife at the school, she was a teacher.

The school was destroyed by arsonists in 1876. It was rebuilt. It was training teachers by 1884. It became Lewis Normal Institute in 1885 and Ballard Normal School in 1888 for donor Stephen A. Ballard. His support helped fund a new building constructed for it in 1889 as well as a dormitory for girls funded by his sister.

The school was relocated to a new alnost 5-acre campus in 1916 after the city purchased the existing site for the expansion of a hospital. By 1923 it was accredited by the Georgia Department of Education. It became a public high school in 1942. In 1949 the school district discontinued use of the school building and it was sold for use as a community center in 1950.

Principals
Christine Gilbert (1880-1882)
W. A. Hodge
Livia A. Shae (1887)
Julia B. Ford (1893)
 Francis T. Waters (1894)
 George C. Burrage (1895)
Frank B. Stevens (1909). 
Raymond G. Von Tobel (1911 - 1935, when he died in a car crash) 
Lewis Mounts (acting principal)
James A. Colston (1938 - 1943, he left.to become president of Bethune-Cookman College), the school's first African American principal
Riago Martin (1944)

References

External links 

Schools in Georgia (U.S. state)